Van Feggelen is a Dutch toponymic surname meaning "from Feggelen".

Notable people with the surname include:
Iet van Feggelen (1921–2012), Dutch backstroke swimmer
Ruud van Feggelen (1924–2002), Dutch water polo competitor and coach

References

Dutch-language surnames
Dutch toponymic surnames
Surnames of Dutch origin